Hakea stenocarpa is a shrub in the family Proteaceae, commonly known as narrow-fruited hakea. It has scented creamy-white flowers in clusters, often with curling leaves and is endemic to an area in the Mid West, western Wheatbelt, Peel and the South West regions of Western Australia.

Description
The branchlets are more or less smooth at flowering time. The inflorescence is a single raceme of 14-20 sweetly scented white, creamy-white or yellow flowers in leaf axils in the upper branchlets. The leaves generally curl in an upward spiral. The fruit are rough and warty where they attach to the branches.

Taxonomy and naming
Hakea stenocarpa was first formally described by Robert Brown in 1830 and published the description in Supplementum primum prodromi florae Novae Hollandiae. The specific epithet is derived from the ancient Greek stenos (στενός), "narrow" and karpos (καρπός), "fruit", referring to the shape of the fruit.

Distribution and habitat
Narrow-fruited hakea grows in  heath, low open shrubland and woodland in deep sand, loam, clay and gravel sometimes over laterite. Requires a well-drained site in sun or partial shade.  An ornamental shrub, may be used as a groundcover.

Conservation status
Hakea stenocarpa is classified as "not threatened" by the Western Australian Government Department of Parks and Wildlife.

References

stenocarpa
Eudicots of Western Australia
Taxa named by Robert Brown (botanist, born 1773)